The 1937 Monaco Grand Prix was a Grand Prix motor race held at the Circuit de Monaco on 8 August 1937. The 100 lap event was won by Manfred von Brauchitsch.

Classification

References

External links 
 

Monaco Grand Prix
Monaco Grand Prix
Grand Prix
Monaco Grand Prix